Joseph John Sommer (November 20, 1858 – January 16, 1938) was an American professional baseball outfielder. He played in Major League Baseball (MLB) from 1880 to 1890 for the Cincinnati Stars, Cincinnati Red Stockings, Baltimore Orioles, and Cleveland Spiders.

Sommer and Jimmy Macullar unsuccessfully attempted to engineer the departure of Pop Corkhill and Chick Fulmer from the Reds in 1883, and as a consequence Sommer and Macullar were sent to Baltimore that offseason. There, they helped lead a turnaround for the Orioles in 1884, which secured the status of manager Billy Barnie. Cincinnati replaced Sommer that season by signing Browns outfielder Tom Mansell, with a $400 raise as an inducement.

In 1886, Sommer set the record for the lowest single-season batting average (.209) by a player with 500 or more at-bats. His record was broken in 1888 by Al Myers of the Washington Nationals, who hit .207 that year.

In the 1880s, the New York Clipper praised Sommer as one of the strongest defensive outfielders in baseball.

Sommer managed the Superior Red Sox of the Central International League in 1912.

References

External links

Major League Baseball outfielders
Baseball players from Kentucky
Sportspeople from Covington, Kentucky
Cincinnati Reds (1876–1879) players
Cincinnati Red Stockings (AA) players
Baltimore Orioles (AA) players
Cleveland Spiders players
19th-century baseball players
1858 births
1938 deaths
Baltimore Orioles (Atlantic Association) players
New Haven Nutmegs players
Rochester Flour Cities players
Albany Senators players